Clodualdo A. del Mundo Jr. (born March 11, 1948) is a Filipino screenwriter, director, and author.

In 1968, he got a Bachelor of Arts degree at the Ateneo de Manila University in 1968 followed by a Master of Arts in radio-television-film in 1974 from University of Kansas and a doctoral degree in communication studies at the University of Iowa in 1994. He headed the communication arts department of De La Salle University from 1976 to 1985 and was a founding member and former chairman of the Manunuri ng Pelikulang Pilipino, and vice-president of the Screenwriters Guild of the Philippines.

Del Mundo is a well-respected figure in the Filipino film industry and has garnered amount of critical acclaim for his body of work during the 1970s and 1980s. Pepot Superstaris the first full-length feature written and directed by del Mundo

Del Mundo has directed documentary films like People Media (1978) and Lupa (1982) and has written Writing for Film (1983), and Philippine Mass Media: A Book of Readings (1986) published by the Communication Foundation for Asia.

Affectionally known as "Doy" to his colleagues, he is the son of famous comic book writer Clodualdo del Mundo Sr. He is married to Dreena Quito. They have one child, Ida Anita.

2.

“In writing a film, one has to be interested in the project.  That is a prerequisite.  In my case, I try to write the best I could.  I work outside the mainstream so I do not get projects often.  However, I have a regular job as professor.  In that way, I can choose projects I want to write.  My two jobs complement each other." (The Cinema, The Daily Tribune Newspaper; The Cinema, Ezine Articles.com)

Filmography

Director
2004: Maid in Singapore (documentary)
2005: Pepot Superstar
2008: Ehem! Plo: Corruption & Integrity in Philippine Society (video documentary short)
2010: Tinitingnan, 'Di Nakikita (video documentary short)
2011: Paglipad ng anghel
Producer
2004: Maid in Singapore – executive producer
2005: Pepot Superstar – producer

Writer/Screenwriter
1975: Maynila: Sa mga kuko ng liwanag (English title The Claws of Light) (screenplay)
1977: Itim (screenplay) (as Doy del Mundo)
1977: Sa piling ng mga sugapa (story & screenplay)
1980: Kakabakaba Ka Ba? (screenplay) (as Doy del Mundo)
1981: Kisapmata (screenplay) (as Doy del Mundo Jr.)
1982: Batch '81 (screenplay)
1984: 'Merika (story and screenplay)
1992: Aliwan Paradise (short)
1993: Southern Winds (screenplay)
1996: Mulanay: Sa pusod ng paraiso (story and screenplay) (as Doy del Mundo)
1997: Puerto Princesa1999: Bayaning 3rd World (writer)
2000: Markova: Comfort Gay (screenplay)
2004: Maid in Singapore (documentary) (screenplay)
2005: Pepot Superstar (writer)
2011: Paglipad ng anghel (screenplay)

Awards
1976: FAMAS award for Best screenplay for Maynila: Sa mga kuko ng liwanag at the FAMAS Awards
1981: Metro Manila Film Festival awards for Best Screenplay and Best Story for Kisapmata at the 1981 Metro Manila Film Festival
1983: FAP Award for Best Screenplay for Batch '81 at the Philippines FAP Awards
1983: Gawad Urian Award Best Screenplay for Batch '81at the Gawad Urian Awards
2005: Best Film award (full length film category) for his film Pepot Artista'' at the First Cinemalaya Philippine Independent Film Festival

References

The Cinema, The Daily Tribune Newspaper; The Cinema, 2009, Ezine Articles.com

External links

IMDb: Awards (wins and nominations)
Pop Artista website

Filipino film directors
Filipino screenwriters
Filipino essayists
1948 births
Living people
Ateneo de Manila University alumni
University of Iowa alumni
University of Kansas alumni
Filipino male writers
20th-century male writers
21st-century male writers
20th-century essayists
21st-century essayists
20th-century Filipino writers
21st-century Filipino writers